Herath Mudiyanselage Charitha Malinga Bandara (born 31 December 1979), commonly known as Malinga Bandara, is a former Sri Lankan cricketer, who played all formats. He is a right-handed batsman and also bowls legbreaks. He studied at the Kalutara Vidyalaya.

Domestic career
In Sri Lankan domestic cricket, Bandara played for a variety of sides. Having spent the previous two summers at Normandy CC of the Surrey Championship, turning out in 55 Games for the club, he also played county cricket for English county Gloucestershire during the 2005 season, he was so successful with the ball that he was named "Gloucestershire Player of the Season".  He joined Kent for the 2010 season.

International career
Bandara made his Test debut against New Zealand in 1998 but performed poorly and was subsequently dropped. A useful performance against England 'A' in March 2005 (securing match-figures of eleven for 126) resulted in a Test recall in December. He finished the three-Test series against India with nine wickets at an average of 32.88. 

Bandara made his ODI debut against New Zealand in January 2006 at Wellington and was highly successful in the tournament, taking fourteen wickets at an average of 23.92, a strike rate of 29.2, and an economy rate of 4.90, bettering his more famous spin twin Muttiah Muralitharan. He took his best bowling figures of four for 31 against South Africa in the final VB Series round robin match at the Bellerive Oval, Hobart, on 7 February 2006. This performance ensured Sri Lanka's place in the finals against Australia.

He was subsequently ignored for Pakistan's tour of Sri Lanka in 2005/06 and missed out on the test series in England in 2006.

References

External links
 

1979 births
Basnahira South cricketers
Galle Cricket Club cricketers
Gloucestershire cricketers
Living people
Nondescripts Cricket Club cricketers
Sri Lanka One Day International cricketers
Sri Lanka Test cricketers
Sri Lanka Twenty20 International cricketers
Sri Lankan cricketers
Tamil Union Cricket and Athletic Club cricketers
Kent cricketers
Wayamba cricketers
Uva cricketers
Ruhuna cricketers
Cricketers at the 2010 Asian Games
Asian Games competitors for Sri Lanka